Alister McQueen (born 19 June 1991) is a Canadian athlete who competes in T44 classification track and field events. He was born with only one bone in his left lower leg, and his foot was amputated so he could wear a prosthesis. He is active in several sports.

McQueen won bronze medals at the 2011 Parapan American Games in the 200m event and the javelin throw and qualified to compete in the 2012 Paralympic Games.

See also
 The Mechanics of Running Blades

References

External links
  
 
 

1991 births
Living people
Paralympic track and field athletes of Canada
Athletes (track and field) at the 2012 Summer Paralympics
Athletes (track and field) at the 2016 Summer Paralympics
Medalists at the 2016 Summer Paralympics
Paralympic silver medalists for Canada
Canadian male sprinters
Canadian male javelin throwers
Paralympic medalists in athletics (track and field)
Medalists at the 2011 Parapan American Games
20th-century Canadian people
21st-century Canadian people